Markovo is a rural locality (a village) in Markovskoye Rural Settlement, Vologodsky District, Vologda Oblast, Russia. The population was 13 as of 2002.

Geography 
The distance to Vologda is 26 km, to Vasilyevskoye is 4 km. Redkino is the nearest rural locality.

References 

Rural localities in Vologodsky District